A taxi or taxicab is a vehicle for hire with a driver.

Taxi may also refer to:

Film and TV

Film
 Taxi!, a 1932 film starring James Cagney
 Taxi (1953 film), a 1953 American film starring Dan Dailey
 Taxi!, a 1970 South African film starring Tony Jay
 Taxi!!!, a 1978 made-for-TV drama
 Taxi (1996 film), a 1996 Spanish film directed by Carlos Saura
 Taxi (film series), French action-comedy movies
 Taxi (1998 film), a 1998 film directed by Gérard Pirès
 Taxi 2, a 2000 sequel to the above film, directed by Gérard Krawczyk
 Taxi 3, a 2003 sequel to the above films, directed by Gérard Krawczyk
 Taxi 4, a 2007 sequel to the above films, directed by Gérard Krawczyk
 Taxi 5, a 2018 sequel to the above films, directed by Frank Gastambide
 Taxi (2004 film), American remake of the 1998 film, directed by Tim Story
 Taxi (2015 film), a 2015 Iranian film, directed by Jafar Panahi which is also known as Taxi Tehran

Television 
 Taxi (TV series), an American sitcom that originally aired from 1978 to 1983
 Taxi! (British TV series), a British television comedy-drama series with Sid James (1963–64)
 Taxi Brooklyn, a French-American television series inspired by the Taxi franchise

Music 
 Taxi (Romanian band), a Romanian pop band
 Taxi (Portuguese band), a Portuguese rock band
 Taxi (Gibraltar band), a Gibraltarian pop rock band

Albums
 Taxi (Bryan Ferry album), a 1993 album by Bryan Ferry
 Taxi (Nikos Karvelas album), 1983

Songs
 "Taxi Cab", a song by American musical duo Twenty One Pilots
 "Taxi" (song), a 1972 song by Harry Chapin
 "Taxi", a 1983 song by J. Blackfoot
 "Taxi Cab", a 2010 song by Vampire Weekend from their album Contra
 "El Taxi", a 2015 song by Osmani García ft. Pitbull and Sensato from Pitbull album Dale
 "Taxi", a 2020 song by the Nova Twins

Other uses
 Taxi (book), a 2007 collection of stories by the Egyptian writer Khaled al-Khamissi
 Taxi (chocolate), a chocolate biscuit
 Taxi (pinball), a pinball machine
 Taxiing, moving an aircraft on the ground under its own power

See also
 TAXI (disambiguation)
 Taxi Driver (disambiguation)
 Taxi Taxi (disambiguation)
 Taxicab geometry
 Taxicab number
 Taxis, in biology, is a behavioural response
 Thurn und Taxis, a key player in the postal services in Europe during the 16th century
 Rádio Táxi, a pop rock band from Brazil